The Strong National Museum of Play (known as just The Strong Museum or simply the Strong) is part of The Strong in Rochester, New York, United States. Established in 1969 and based initially on the personal collection of Rochester native Margaret Woodbury Strong, the museum opened to the public in 1982, after several years of planning, cataloguing, and exhibition development for the museum's new building in downtown Rochester. For at least fifteen years after its opened, the mission of the museum was to interpret the social and cultural history of average Americans between 1830 and 1940, under the direction of H.J. Swinney and William T. Alderson. Mrs. Strong's collections of dolls and toys, American and European decorative arts, prints, paintings, Japanese crafts, and advertising ephemera provided a firm foundation for this mission, and were supplemented with collections purchased and donated to more fully support the museum's early mission. The museum received considerable local and national publicity and support and substantial financial support from the National Endowment for the Humanities' Exhibitions and Public Programs division.

In the 1990s, the museum's Board of Trustees and director changed the museum's mission to collecting, preserving, and interpreting the history of play. Since then it has refined and increased its collections (hundreds of thousands of items), and expanded twice, in 1997 and 2006.

The museum is now one of five Play Partners of The Strong, which is also home to the National Toy Hall of Fame, the International Center for the History of Electronic Games, and the Brian Sutton-Smith Library and Archives of Play, and produces the American Journal of Play.

About

The National Museum of Play is the only collections-based museum anywhere devoted solely to the study of play, and although it is a history museum, it has the interactive characteristics of a children's museum, making it the second largest museum of that type in the United States. The museum includes exhibits that interpret the key elements of play, as well as allow guests to explore the worlds of Sesame Street, The Berenstain Bears, Reading Adventureland, and the Dancing Wings Butterfly Garden.

The museum's exhibits are immersively themed for video games, storybooks, television shows, education, nature, history, comic books, carousel and train rides, and children's lifestyles. eGameRevolution is the first permanent video game exhibit in the US and includes the World Video Game Hall of Fame. The National Toy Hall of Fame is at the museum. Dancing Wings Butterfly Garden features thousands of butterflies, and is the largest indoor butterfly garden in New York. The Berenstain Bears: Down a Sunny Dirt Road is an original, permanent exhibit produced in partnership with the Berenstain family.

The Strong Museum received a  grant from the National Endowment for the Humanities to develop an interactive exhibit space to show the influence of video games on culture; the space is planned to open in 2022.

See also
Videotopia

References

External links
American Journal of Play official website
The National Museum of Play official website
The Strong National Museum of Play at Google Cultural Institute

Museums established in 1982
Children's museums in New York (state)
Museums in Rochester, New York
Toy museums in the United States
Smithsonian Institution affiliates
1982 establishments in New York (state)